Metacnemis is a genus of damselfly in the family Platycnemididae. It contains one species: Metacnemis valida

Spesbona angusta was moved from this genus in 2013. This genus was included in the subfamily Allocnemidinae in 2014.

References

Platycnemididae
Zygoptera genera
Taxonomy articles created by Polbot
Monotypic Odonata genera